Paula Arenas (born May 1, 1988 in Bogotá, Colombia) is a Colombian pop singer-songwriter. In 2011 and 2012 she released two extended plays with her name Paula Arenas, the following years she released a couple of singles as "Me Hace Bien", "Sola", "Lo Que El Tiempo Dejó" (featuring Esteman), "Excesos" and "Un Día Cualquiera". "Lo Que El Tiempo Dejó" was a top 10 hit in Colombia. Then she moved to Miami and started over her process as singer and changed her professional name to Paula. In 2016 released her debut single called "Nada" produced by Julio Reyes Copello, it received a generally positive response and support in social networks from Carla Morrison and compatriot singers Juanes and Fonseca. In May 2016 she supported Alejandro Sanz as the opening act on his 'Sirope' tour in Colombia. In 2017 she released a single called 'Tanto Tanto' followed by her third EP Matices. She was nominated for the Latin Grammy Award for Best New Artist at the 18th Annual Latin Grammy Awards in 2017.

Discography

Studio albums
Visceral (2019)

Extended plays

Singles

Music videos

Awards and nominations

Latin Grammy Awards
A Latin Grammy Award is an accolade by the Latin Academy of Recording Arts & Sciences to recognize outstanding achievement in the music industry.

|-
| rowspan=1|2017 || Paula Arenas || Best New Artist || 
|-
| rowspan=3|2019 || rowspan=2| Visceral || Album of the Year || 
|-
| Best Traditional Pop Vocal Album || 
|-
| Buena Para Nada || Best Pop Song ||

References

External links 
Paula (Official Website)
 Art House Records

1988 births
Living people
Colombian pop singers
21st-century Colombian women singers
People from Bogotá
Women in Latin music
Latin music songwriters